The Omolon (Omoloon) is the principal tributary of the Kolyma in northeast Siberia. The Omolon freezes up in October and stays under ice until late May through early June. The lower  are navigable.

Course
Its basin is surrounded by: (west) branches of the Kolyma, (south) Penzhina and others that flow south, (east) Anadyr and (northeast) Bolshoy Anyuy.  

Flora and fauna
The upper Omolon is subalpine in the highlands, the middle is boreal forest and the lower part tundra. There is a Zakaznik in Chukotka to protect the forests.

See also
List of rivers of Russia

References

External links
Омолонский - ООПТ России (Omolonsky Protected Area)
 Omolon river problems
   
 Meteorite found near the Omolon River

Rivers of the Sakha Republic
Rivers of Magadan Oblast
Rivers of Chukotka Autonomous Okrug